Andrei Savchenko (born July 10, 1972) is a professional ice hockey defenceman currently playing for Companion Kyiv of the Ukrainian Major League.

Savchenko started his career for SHVSM Kyiv in the Ukrainian Major League and played for HC Sokil Kyiv after that.

References

External links

1972 births
Expatriate ice hockey players in Russia
HC CSKA Moscow players
Living people
Severstal Cherepovets players
Soviet ice hockey defencemen
Sportspeople from Kyiv
Ukrainian ice hockey defencemen